Steve Lyon (born May 16, 1952) is a Canadian former professional ice hockey player who played 3 games in the National Hockey League with the Pittsburgh Penguins during the 1976–77 season.

Career
Lyon signed with the Pittsburgh Penguins as a free agent in November 1976. He played a total of 3 games at the NHL level.

Career statistics

Regular season and playoffs

Awards
IHL First All-Star Team (1974, 1975)

External links
 

1952 births
Living people
Canadian ice hockey right wingers
Columbus Owls players
Grand Rapids Owls players
Ice hockey people from Toronto
Minnesota North Stars draft picks
Ontario Hockey Association Senior A League (1890–1979) players
Peterborough Petes (ice hockey) players
Pittsburgh Penguins players
Rochester Americans players
Saginaw Gears players